The 2007 Ebonyi State gubernatorial election was the 7th gubernatorial election of Ebonyi State. Held on April 14, 2007, the People's Democratic Party nominee Martin Elechi won the election, defeating Ogbonnaya Onu of the All Nigeria Peoples Party.

Results 
Martin Elechi from the People's Democratic Party won the election, defeating Ogbonnaya Onu from the All Nigeria Peoples Party. Registered voters was 929,375.

References 

Ebonyi State gubernatorial elections
Ebonyi gubernatorial
April 2007 events in Nigeria